Hang-Sang Poon is a Hong Kong-Canadian cinematographer, film director, producer and actor. Poon is best known for his cinematography in collaboration with directors such as Yim Ho, Ronny Yu, Stephen Chow, Stephen Fung, John Woo, Po-Chih Leong, Johnnie To, Tsiu Hark, as well as his contribution to the Hong Kong film industry since the 1980s.

Poon is the two-time recipient of the Hong Kong Film Award for Best Cinematography for the films The Island (1985) and Center Stage (1992). Poon has been selected by The Academy of Motion Picture Arts and Sciences as Hong Kong representative for Oscar’s board of judges in 2016. He has also had nine nominations for the Hong Kong Film Award for Best Cinematography, including Home Coming (1984), Peking Opera Blues (1986), A Chinese Ghost Story (1987), Shanghai Grand (1996), and Kung Fu Hustle (2004). In 1990 and 1991, the films Red Dust and Center Stage won him the Best Cinematography Award in the 27th and 28th Golden Horse Award respectively. The film Who Am I? (1998) featuring Jackie Chan has earned him a nomination of the same Award in the 35th Golden Horse Award.

Poon is an alumnus of the Academy of Film of the School of Communication, Hong Kong Baptist University. He is currently a lecturer at the Hong Kong Baptist University teaching cinematography and lighting.

Early life 
Poon studied at the Communication Department of the Hong Kong Baptist College, majoring in film studies. After his graduation in 1976, he joined Radio & Television Hong Kong as a cameraman, where he gained early experiences in cinematography and lighting practices.

Cinematography

Producer

Directory

Artistic Directory

Acting

References

External links 
 Hang Sang Poon at IMDb

Year of birth missing (living people)
Living people